The Case of Colonel Redl (German: Der Fall des Generalstabs-Oberst Redl) is a 1931 German spy drama film directed by Karl Anton and starring Theodor Loos, Lil Dagover and Otto Hartmann. It was co-production between the Prague-based company Elektafilm and Sonor Film. A separate Czech-language film The Affair of Colonel Redl was also produced. It was based on a 1924 novel of the same title by Egon Kisch, based on the story of Alfred Redl.

Synopsis
In the years leading up to the First World War, Colonel Redl of the Austrian army acts as a double agent for enemy powers.

Cast
 Theodor Loos as 	Oberst Alfred Redl
 Lil Dagover as Vera Nikolayevna
 Otto Hartmann as Stephan Dolan, Ulanenleutnant
 Friedrich Hölzlin as Marchenko
 Alexander Murski as 	Daragaieff, russischer Spion
 Werner Jansch as 	Der Chef des russischen Spionageddienstes in Petersburg
 Michael von Newlinsky as Der russische Botschafter in Wien
 Willy Bauer as General Conrad von Hoetzendorf, Chef des Generalstabs der Österrichischen Armee
 Magnus Stifter as 	Oberst Umanizky, Chef des Evidenzbüros in Wien
 Hans Götz as 	Ein Erzherzog
 Dr. Weinmann as 	Der Korpskommandant von Prag
 Philipp Veit as 	Der Polizeipräsident von Wien
 Leo Dudek as Erster Detektiv
 Rudolf Stadler as Zweiter Detektiv
 Truda Grosslichtová as Franzi 
 Luigi Bernauer as Ein Stimmungssänger im Wiener 'Trocadero'

References

Bibliography 
 Von Dassanowsky, Robert. Screening Transcendence: Film Under Austrofascism and the Hollywood Hope, 1933-1938. Indiana University Press, 2018

External links 
 

1931 films
Films of the Weimar Republic
German drama films
1931 drama films
1930s German-language films
Films directed by Karl Anton
German black-and-white films
1930s German films
Films set in Vienna
Films set in the 1910s
1920s spy films
German spy films
Films based on Czech novels